Major General Stanley Gorenc (born  1954) is a retired United States Air Force major general who last served as the Air Force Chief of Safety, Headquarters United States Air Force, Washington, D.C., and Commander, Air Force Safety Center, Kirtland Air Force Base, New Mexico. He developed, executed and evaluated all Air Force aviation, ground, weapons, space and system mishap prevention, and nuclear surety programs to preserve combat readiness. Additionally, he was responsible for conducting research to promote safety awareness and mishap prevention, oversaw mishap investigations, evaluated corrective actions, and ensured implementation. Finally, he managed, developed, and directed all Air Force safety and operational risk management education courses.

Early life
Gorenc was born in Brezovica, Yugoslavia, present day Slovenia. Stanley and his younger brother, Frank immigrated with their parents to the United States from the former Yugoslavia in 1962 when they were 8 and 4. After arriving in America, their father worked as a tailor and their mother served as a factory machine operator.

Military career
Gorenc earned his commission in 1975 as a graduate from the United States Air Force Academy. He has commanded a flying training squadron, fighter operations group and three wings: a training wing responsible for the Euro-NATO Joint Jet Pilot Training Program, a reconnaissance wing responsible for the Air Force's entire high-altitude reconnaissance fleet, and, for several months, the 380th Air Expeditionary Wing responsible for conducting combat operations in Southwest Asia. He also commanded United States Air Forces Europe for six months.

Gorenc has served in various operational and staff assignments, including a tour as an exchange officer with the Royal Air Force. Prior to his last assignment, he served as Director, Operational Capability Requirements, Deputy Chief of Staff for Air, Space and Information Operations, Plans and Requirements, Headquarters United States Air Force.

Gorenc retired on July 1, 2007.

Education
1975 Bachelor of Science degree in civil engineering, U.S. Air Force Academy, Colorado Springs, Colorado
1979 Squadron Officer School, Maxwell Air Force Base, Alabama
1985 Air Command and Staff College, by seminar
1986 Royal Air Force Staff College, Royal Air Force Bracknell, England
1988 Master's degree in aeronautical science, Embry-Riddle Aeronautical University, Daytona, Florida
1993 Industrial College of the Armed Forces, Fort Lesley J. McNair, Washington, D.C.
2002 Black Sea Security Program, John F. Kennedy School of Government, Harvard University, Cambridge, Massachusetts
2004 Combined Force Air Component Commander Course, Maxwell Air Force Base, Alabama

Publications
"Dynamic Commitment: Wargaming Projected Forces Against the QDR Defense Strategy," Strategic Forum, National Defense University Press, 1997

Assignments
 July 1975 – August 1976, student, undergraduate pilot training, Columbus Air Force Base, Mississippi
 September 1976 – November 1976, student, fighter lead-in training, Holloman Air Force Base, New Mexico
 December 1976 – June 1977, student, F-4E combat crew training, George Air Force Base, California
 July 1977 – July 1980, F-4E aircraft commander and unit plans and readiness officer, 496th Tactical Squadron, Hahn Air Base, West Germany
 July 1980 – September 1983, T-38 instructor pilot, wing flight examiner and chief, T-38 Air Operations Branch, German air force undergraduate pilot training, later Euro-NATO Joint Jet Pilot Training Program, 80th Flying Training Wing, Sheppard Air Force Base, Texas
 September 1983 – December 1985, Command Flight Examiner, Standardization and Evaluation Division, Headquarters Air Training Command, Randolph Air Force Base, Texas
 December 1985 – December 1986, student, Royal Air Force Staff College, Royal Air Force Bracknell, England
 January 1987 – January 1989, U.S. Air Force and Royal Air Force Officer Exchange Program and air operations staff officer, Headquarters Royal Air Force Support Command, Royal Air Force Brampton, England
 January 1989 – April 1990, chief of Standardization and Evaluation Division, 12th Flying Training Wing, Randolph Air Force Base, Texas
 April 1990 – May 1991, operations officer, 560th Flying Training Squadron, Randolph Air Force Base, Texas
 May 1991 – July 1992, commander of 54th Flying Training Squadron, Reese Air Force Base, Texas
 August 1992 – June 1993, student, Industrial College of the Armed Forces, Fort Lesley J. McNair, Washington, D.C.
 July 1993 – June 1995, deputy commander, later commander, of 56th Operations Group, Luke Air Force Base, Arizona
 July 1995 – November 1997, chief of Studies, Analysis and Gaming Division, J-8, Force Structure, Resources and Assessment Directorate, Joint Staff, Washington, D.C.
 November 1997 – May 1999, commander of 80th Flying Training Wing, Sheppard Air Force Base, Texas
 May 1999 – September 2000, vice commander, Headquarters 5th Air Force, Yokota Air Base, Japan
 September 2000 – March 2003, commander of 9th Reconnaissance Wing, Beale Air Force Base, California (December 2001 – February 2002, Commander, 380th Air Expeditionary Wing, Southwest Asia)
 March 2003 – February 2004, director of plans and programs, Headquarters U. S. Air Forces in Europe, Ramstein Air Base, Germany
 February 2004 – October 2004, commander, Air Forces Europe, Ramstein Air Base, Germany
 October 2004 – July 2006, director of operational capability requirements, Deputy Chief of Staff for Air, Space and Information Operations, Plans and Requirements, Headquarters U.S. Air Force, Washington, D.C.
 July 2006 – 2007, Air Force Chief of Safety, Headquarters U.S. Air Force, Washington, D.C., and Commander, Air Force Safety Center, Kirtland Air Force Base, New Mexico

Flight information
Rating: Command pilot
Flight hours: More than 3,250 hours
Aircraft flown: F-4E, F-15E, F-16, T-37, T-38, U-2, and the British Aerospace Hawk

Awards and decorations

Other achievements
1982 Instructor Pilot of the Year, Air Training Command
Distinguished graduate, pilot instructor training, Sheppard Air Force Base, Texas
Top Crew award, F-4 conversion training, George Air Force Base, California
Chief of Staff Award, Squadron Officer School, Maxwell Air Force Base, Alabama

Effective dates of promotion

References

Year of birth missing (living people)
Living people
American people of Slovenian descent
United States Air Force generals
Recipients of the Air Force Distinguished Service Medal
Recipients of the Legion of Merit
Harvard Kennedy School alumni
United States Air Force Academy alumni